Maria Charizze Ina Dela Cruz is a Filipino-American international footballer who plays as a goalkeeper.

Early life and education
Maria dela Cruz was born on November 13, 1993 in Cagayan de Oro, Philippines to Lew Chaney and Evelyn dela Cruz. Dela Cruz move to the United States at age 4 and spent some of her childhood in Roseville, California. Dela Cruz graduated from Granite Bay High School. She played for her high school's basketball and association football team for three years and four years respectively. She later moved to Idaho to study at Idaho State University.

International career
In 2013, Dela Cruz was called up by the Philippines for the 2014 AFC Women's Asian Cup qualifiers. She made her first international debut against Iran and kept a clean sheet against her team's opponents. The final scoreline for the match was 6–0.

References

1993 births
Living people
American sportspeople of Filipino descent
Filipino expatriates in the United States
Filipino women's footballers
Philippines women's international footballers
Women's association football goalkeepers
Sportspeople from Cagayan de Oro